Desires is a 1952 German drama film directed by Rolf Hansen. It was entered into the 1952 Cannes Film Festival.

Cast
 Heidemarie Hatheyer as Anna Falkner
 O. W. Fischer as Hans Falkner
 Sybil Werden as Bozena Boroszi
 René Deltgen as Dr. med. Steininger
 Carl Wery as Sanitätsrat Dr. Falkner
 Hilde Körber as Fanny
 Liesl Karlstadt
 Harald Paulsen as Brendel
 Iván Petrovich as Direktor Wallberg
 Bobby Todd

References

External links

1952 films
1952 drama films
German drama films
West German films
1950s German-language films
Films directed by Rolf Hansen
Films about drugs
Adultery in films
German black-and-white films
1950s German films